Dame Gillian Karawe Whitehead  (born 23 April 1941) is a New Zealand composer. She is of Māori Ngāi Te Rangi descent. Her Māori heritage has been an important influence on her composing.

Early life 
Whitehead was born in Hamilton in 1941. The daughter of Ivan and Marjorie Whitehead, she is of Ngāi Te Rangi descent. Her father was a music teacher and conductor of the Waipu Choral Society and her mother played the piano. She began composing early, making clear to her mother at age 17 that she wanted to be a composer.

Education 
She studied at the University of Auckland from 1959 to 1962, and Victoria University of Wellington in 1963, graduating BMus(Hons) in 1964. She then studied composition at the University of Sydney with Peter Sculthorpe from 1964–65, graduating MMus in 1966. That same year she attended a composition course given by Peter Maxwell Davies and in 1967 travelled to England to continue studying with him.

Career
She worked in London composing and copying music for two years and then with the assistance of a New Zealand Arts Council grant worked in Portugal and Italy from 1969 to 1970. For the next seven years she continued freelance composing, principally based in the United Kingdom. From 1978 to 1980, she held an English academic post, having been during that time Composer in Residence for Northern Arts attached to Newcastle University.

In 1981, she returned to New South Wales, to join the staff of the Composition School at the Sydney Conservatorium of Music. She was Head of Composition for four years. She left the Conservatorium in 1996. Since then she has spent most of her time in New Zealand, mostly in Dunedin.

In 1989 she was Composer in Residence at Victoria University of Wellington. She took up the Mozart Fellowship at the University of Otago in 1992. During 2000 and 2001 she was Composer in Residence at the Auckland Philharmonia. Her major orchestral work, The Improbable Ordered Dance, written during the Residency won the 2001 SOUNZ Contemporary Award.

From 1998 to 2003 she was president of the Composers Association of New Zealand. In 2005–2006 she was the Composer in Residence at the New Zealand School of Music at Victoria University. She was the first Composer in Residence to stay at the Lilburn Residence.

In 2009 Whitehead was one of the 2009 Henderson Arts Trust artists-in-residence in Alexandra.

Compositions 
Whitehead has written a wide range of music including works for solo, chamber, choral, orchestral and operatic forces, most of them direct commissions from performers and funding organisations. A number of her works have been recorded for commercial release, including a CD of her chamber works by Wai-te-ata Music Press and a recording of her opera, Outrageous Fortune.

Outrageous Fortune (1998) was commissioned by the Otago Commemorative Opera Group, Te Atamira Whakamaumahara to mark 150 years since the founding of the city of Dunedin and Otago province. Another opera, The Art of Pizza (1995), was commissioned by Chamber Mode, a Melbourne opera group. Set in a Sydney shopping mall it looks at the situation of refugees. 

The New Zealand Symphony Orchestra commissioned Whitehead to write a piece to commemorate the 250th anniversary of Captain Cook's arrival in New Zealand; she produced Turanga-nui (2018), referring to the name of Gisborne and Cook's landfall there.

In 2020 she wrote a piece especially for the baroque ensemble Juilliard451 from the Juilliard School of Music in New York who toured New Zealand.

Influence of Māori heritage and instruments 
Since her time in London Whitehead has used Māori themes in her work. Pakuru (1967), for baritone and ensemble, is based on Māori sayings and the seasonal cycle. She began to incorporate taonga pūoro (traditional Māori instruments) in her work in the 1990s after meeting Hirini Melbourne and Richard Nunns. Her Lilburn Lecture in 2019 examined how she uses the sounds of taonga pūoro. Other works with Māori themes include Ahotu (ō matenga) (1984), Outrageous Fortune (1998), Hineraukatauri (1999) and Hine-pu-te-hue (2001).

Use of magic squares 
Whitehead has used magic squares in her composition, also used by Peter Maxwell Davies and others. She first read about them in the 1970s and used them for the next 20 years. In the 1980s when she moved to Sydney she used squares but much more freely and later pieces combined prime numbers and squares in a more integrated way. Squares remained as the starting point of her composing but later she moved to compose more instinctively. She acknowledged the process of using a systematic approach, its potential and then moving away from it.

Honours and awards
In the 1999 New Year Honours, Whitehead was appointed a Member of the New Zealand Order of Merit, for services to music.  She has received two awards from the Arts Foundation: an Arts Foundation Laureate in 2000 and an Arts Foundation Icon in 2018. Victoria University of Wellington awarded her an honorary DMus in 2003. In 2007 she received the Composers Association KBB/CANZ Citation for Services to Music. In the 2008 Queen's Birthday Honours, she was promoted to Distinguished Companion of the New Zealand Order of Merit, also for services to music. In 2009, following the reinstatement of titular honours by the New Zealand government, Whitehead accepted redesignation as a Dame Companion of the New Zealand Order of Merit.

Selected works

Orchestral works 

 Turanga-nui (2018)

Operas 

 Tristan and Iseult (1976)
The King of the Other Country (1984) - libretto by Fleur Adcock
The Art of Pizza (1995) – libretto by Anna Maria Dell'Oso
Outrageous Fortune (1998)

Vocal and instrumental works 

 Pakuru (1967)
 Inner Harbour (1979) – based on Fleur Adcock's poems
 Hotspur (1980) – based on Fleur Adcock's poems

Ensemble works 

 Ahotu (ō matenga) (1984)

References

Bibliography
Sanders, Noel. (2010) Moon, Tide & Shoreline: Gillian Karawe Whitehead: A Life in Music. Steele Roberts Publishers: Wellington, Aotearoa, New Zealand.

External links
 Dame Gillian Whitehead's Official Website containing information on her operas, orchestral works, choral pieces, vocal and instrumental chamber compositions, solo works, pieces involving taonga puoro and compositions including improvisation.
 Sounz, The Centre for New Zealand Music. A biography and selected list of works. 
 Australian Music Centre | Gillian Whitehead : Represented Artist
 Opera Glass: Composers: W
 The Arts Foundation | Dame Gillian Whitehead | Ngāi Terangi | DNZM, MNZM Composer
 New Zealand String Quartet | Gillian Karawe Whitehead
 Arts on Sunday, RNZ, Sunday 12 December 2010 – Dame Gillian Whitehead and Noel Sanders talk about the book 'Moon, Tides, and Shoreline' which explores Gillian's life.
 Arts on Sunday, RNZ, Sunday 12 December 2010 – With a new biography out, Dame Gillian talks about her life in music.
 
 Dame Gillian Whitehead Collection at the Alexander Turnbull Library

1941 births
Academics of Newcastle University
Living people
Dames Companion of the New Zealand Order of Merit
New Zealand classical composers
University of Sydney alumni
Victoria University of Wellington alumni
Australian women classical composers
New Zealand opera composers
21st-century classical composers
20th-century classical composers
Pupils of Peter Maxwell Davies
Women opera composers
20th-century women composers
21st-century women composers